Charles Flint may refer to:

 Charles Louis Flint (1824–1889), President of the University of Massachusetts
 Charles Ranlett Flint (1850–1934), American businessman, founder of a company which later became IBM
 Charles Wesley Flint, American bishop in the Methodist Church